Goehring or Göhring is a German surname. Notable people with the surname include:
Hermann Göring (1893–1946), German politician and military leader
Alan Goehring (born 1962), American poker player
Dietmar Göhring (born 1960), German swimmer
Doug Goehring, American politician
Karl Goehring (born 1978), American ice hockey player
Kate Goehring, American actress
Kenneth O. Goehring (1919–2007), American painter
Leo Goehring (1891–1967), American track and field athlete
Nicole Goehring (born 1976), Canadian politician
Oswald Helmuth Göhring (1889 – ), German chemist

Margot Becke-Goehring (1914–2009), German chemist

German-language surnames